Arthur Guinness (1725–1803) was the Irish entrepreneur founding Guinness brewers.

Arthur Guinness may also refer to:
 The Second Arthur Guinness (1768–1855), Dublin brewer and banker, father of Benjamin Guinness
 Arthur Guinness, 1st Baron Ardilaun (1840–1915), Irish businessman, politician, and philanthropist
 Arthur C. C. J. Guinness (1841–1897), a son of Richard Samuel Guinness
 Arthur Guinness (New Zealand politician) (1846–1913), Member of Parliament
 Arthur Guinness, 4th Earl of Iveagh (born 1969)